Odyssey Airlines is a British startup airline headquartered in London with a planned base at London City Airport. It was founded in 2010 and is preparing to launch operations in late 2020 / early 2021.

History 
The airline incorporated in September 2010 and is headquartered at a business property at Spital Square in London. The airline was first revealed in an article by Reuters in December 2011, citing it as being one of the undisclosed customers of the Bombardier CSeries aircraft, now the Airbus A220-100. During the 2013 Paris Air Show, Bombardier and Odyssey officially revealed the identity of the airline to the public, with an original launch year stated as 2016.

In April 2014, it started to raise $5 million through crowdfunding. Since 2016, the launch date has been pushed back several times.

Odyssey Airlines plans to operate as a premium carrier, offering an all-business class service onboard its aircraft. The planned service from London-City to New York was previously operated in a similar way by British Airways on board an Airbus A318-100 in all-business class configuration.

Destinations 
The airline plans to be based at London City Airport and will serve mainly medium and long haul destinations, such as New York City and Toronto. A detailed plan of further future destinations has not been revealed yet.

Fleet

See also 
 London City Airport

References

External links 
 

Proposed airlines of the United Kingdom
Airlines based in London
Airlines established in 2010
British companies established in 2010